Diogo Costa Ventura (born June 24, 1994) is a Portuguese professional basketball player who plays for Sporting CP and for the Portuguese National Team.

References

1996 births
Living people
Portuguese men's basketball players
Sporting CP basketball players
Point guards
Sportspeople from Almada